Club Sport Marítimo is an amateur Portuguese futsal team based in Funchal, Madeira, and is part of the C.S. Marítimo sports club. After winning the Madeira regional leagues, the team was promoted to the national leagues for the 2008-09 season, and are currently competing in Division 3. The team plays all of its home games at the Pavilhão do Marítimo arena.

Honours
Madeira Regional Championship: Winners 2007/08
Madeira Cup: Winners 2005/06

Current Squad 2008/09

See also
C.S. Marítimo

External links
CSMarítimo.pt Official club website
CS Marítimo Futsal team website

 
Futsal clubs in Portugal